Psydrocercops wisteriae is a moth of the family Gracillariidae. It is known from China (Beijing), Hong Kong, Japan (Honshū, Kyūshū, Shikoku) and the Russian Far East.

The wingspan is 6–9 mm.

The larvae feed on Wisteria floribunda. They mine the leaves of their host plant. The mine usually occurs upon the upper surface of the leaf or leaflet. In early stages, the mine is narrow, long, and irregularly curved in a serpentine-type. Later, it is broadened into a large blister-like blotch. The extremely early mine is usually epidermal, brightly whitish and transparent. When the larva consumes the parenchymal tissue within the blotchy part, it leaves the mine for a pupating site through a semicircular slit. The cocoon is small, boat-shaped, with some bubbles on the surface. The full-grown larva is reddish in body colour.

References

Acrocercopinae
Moths of Japan
Moths described in 1982